Mount Dempo is the highest stratovolcano in South Sumatra province that rises above Pasumah Plain near Pagar Alam and adjacent with Bengkulu Province. Seven craters are found around the summit.

Activities present been in 2009 and most recently, May 31, 2022. Historical activity has been confined to being small-to-moderate explosive activity that produced ashfall near the volcano.

At 1:54 AM (GMT+7), a small phreatic explosion occurred causing small pyroclastic flows to ride down the northwest slope a few hundred meters downward, resulting to no injuries nor any damage to the surrounding landscape other than the volcano itself, lasting no more than 239s/3m59s.

The Royal Rotterdam Lloyd Dutch shipping company named and operated a fine passenger liner named 'Dempo' from 1931 to 1944 between Europe and South Asia.

See also 

 List of Ultras of Malay Archipelago
 List of volcanoes in Indonesia

References

External links 
 Mount Dempo on Mountain-Forecast.com

Volcanoes of Sumatra
Active volcanoes
Stratovolcanoes of Indonesia
Mountains of Sumatra
Landforms of South Sumatra
Holocene stratovolcanoes